is a Japanese footballer who plays for V-Varen Nagasaki.

Club statistics
Updated to 1 March 2019.

References

External links
Profile at V-Varen Nagasaki

 Profile at Shimizu S-Pulse

1991 births
Living people
Chuo University alumni
Association football people from Kumamoto Prefecture
Japanese footballers
J1 League players
J2 League players
Roasso Kumamoto players
Shimizu S-Pulse players
V-Varen Nagasaki players
Association football forwards